Lawrence Edwin Kimble (September 21, 1904 – September 3, 1977) was an American screenwriter.

Early life and career
On September 21, 1904, Kimble was born in Bakersfield, California, one of five children born to Sarah Elizabeth Stanley and Arthur William Kimble.
Beginning in 1924, Kimble worked for several years as a reporter with The Bakersfield Californian before making his screenwriting debut in 1936 with All American Chump. He was a charter member of the Screen Writers Guild.

Personal life
On June 1, 1935, Kimble married Marjorie Hedrick.

Death
On September 3, 1977, Kimble died of a heart attack at Valley Presbyterian Hospital. He was survived by a son and a granddaughter.

Selected filmography
 The Country Bumpkin (1936)
 Submarine D-1 (1937)
 Love, Honor and Behave (1938)
 The Adventures of Jane Arden (1939)
 It All Came True (1940)
 The Devil Pays Off (1941)
 Pardon My Stripes (1942)
 Pierre of the Plains (1942)
 Bells of Capistrano (1942)
 The Bugle Sounds (1942)
 Moonlight Masquerade (1942)
 Tahiti Honey (1943)
 Music in Manhattan (1944)
 Seven Days Ashore (1944)
 Pan-Americana (1945)
 The Bamboo Blonde (1946)
 Beat the Band (1947)
 Angel on the Amazon (1948)
 Mystery in Mexico (1948)
 Hit Parade of 1951 (1950)

References

Bibliography
  Len D. Martin. The Republic Pictures Checklist: Features, Serials, Cartoons, Short Subjects and Training Films of Republic Pictures Corporation, 1935-1959. McFarland, 1998.

External links

1904 births
1977 deaths
20th-century American screenwriters
People from Bakersfield, California
Screenwriters from California